Menderes is a district of İzmir Province in Turkey.

Overview
The antique city of Lebedos is situated in the western corner of the district in Ürkmez locality. Ruins of Kolophon, Klaros, Notion and Lebedos, which are along the Menderes-Selçuk road are next to each other and make up the important archeological sites of the province. Gümüldür municipality is the region that produces the world-famous tangerine breed of satsumas. Özdere is one of the important tourism resorts of the Aegean coast. Beads of various colors and shapes which are produced by the locals in Görece village are particularly of note. The area was called Cumaovası and was a township in the Konak (Centre) district before it became a district in 1988.

See also
 September 2012 Baradan Bay, Turkey migrant boat disaster

References

Populated places in İzmir Province
Menderes (Cumaovası) District
Populated coastal places in Turkey
Districts of İzmir Province